Cornhill-on-Tweed is a small village and civil parish in Northumberland, England about  to the east of Coldstream, Scotland. The hamlets of West Learmouth and East Learmouth are located to the south and west of the village respectively.

History 
A mile north-west of the village, on a spur above the River Tweed are the earthwork remains of Cornhill Castle. At the west end of the village, Cornhill House, a private residence is also thought to have originated as a castle, archaeological work was carried out on and around the building in 2019 by AAG Archaeology.

Religion 
In the center of the town lies St Helen's Church, part of the parish of Cornhill-on-Tweed. Its sister churches are in Carham and Branxton. A church has resided on the site since Saxon times. Local legend has it that in 1840, when the Church was enlarged, an 8 ft man was found buried under the nave.

Transport 

Education  
The Cornhill School was built in 1837 and closed in 2012. Pupils from the village now attended schools nearby.

See also 
Cornhill Branch
Heaton Castle, an historic small castle, the remains of which now form part of a large farmhouse called "Castle Heaton".

References

External links

The official Cornhill-on-Tweed Parish Website
Cornhill Social History including Buildings, Agriculture, Railways, Families, Businesses, School, Parish Registers and gravestone inscriptions
GENUKI (Accessed: 21 November 2008)

Villages in Northumberland